Bellamya liberiana is a species of operculate freshwater snail, an aquatic gastropod mollusc in the family Viviparidae, the river snails or mystery snails. This species is endemic to Liberia.

References

Viviparidae
Endemic fauna of Liberia
Invertebrates of West Africa
Taxonomy articles created by Polbot